The Symphony in D major, Op. 3, No. 2 is a symphony by Johann Stamitz, written in the style of the Mannheim school sometime from 1750 to 1754. The symphony was published as No. 4 in a 1769 publication of six symphonies by Stamitz. It consists of four movements:
Presto
Andantino
Menuetto – Trio
Prestissimo
It is about 10 minutes long.

This symphony is also notable for being one of the first to give distinct independence to the flutes and oboes, rather than having them simply reinforce the first violin part, as had been the convention for earlier symphonic works.

Notes

External links

Symphony D Major
Stamitz